The Whanganui National Park is a national park located in the North Island of New Zealand. Established in 1986, it covers an area of 742 km2 bordering the Whanganui River. It incorporates areas of Crown land, former state forest and a number of former reserves. The river itself is not part of the park.

Flora and fauna
The park protects the habitat of several thousand North Island brown kiwi, and the also-endangered blue duck. Other birds in the park include the grey warbler, New Zealand pigeon, silvereye, tomtit, tui and whitehead.

See also 
Bridge to Nowhere, New Zealand
National parks of New Zealand
Protected areas of New Zealand
Conservation in New Zealand

References

External links

Whanganui National Park Department of Conservation

National parks of New Zealand
Protected areas of Manawatū-Whanganui
Protected areas established in 1986
1986 establishments in New Zealand